Tum Mere Paas Raho; (English: Stay Close To Me) is a 2015 Pakistani romantic drama serial written by Inam Hasan for Hum TV. The series is directed by Saife Hassan and produced by Momina Duraid. It stars Arij Fatyma, Zahid Ahmed (actor), Saba Faisal, Bushra Ansari, Muhammad Mukhtar, Amna Ilyas, Hassan Niazi, Saleem Mairaj and Aisha Khan (Senior). The drama airs every Wednesday at 8pm.

Story
Rabia & Ahmed at long last find happiness when they adopt a child named Tabish. As the time passes, Rabia becomes overprotective about the child while Ahmed starts dictating the life of Tabish. Tabish's possessive mother refuses to let him marry the girl he likes as she is scared that she will lose him. Though she bows to his wishes, she is still reluctant to accept her new daughter-in-law.

Cast
 Arij Fatyma as Zoya
 Zahid Ahmed as Tabish
 Amna Ilyas as Mariam
 Saba Faisal as Tabish's birth mother
 Bushra Ansari as Tabish's adopting mother
 Muhammad Mukhtar
 Hassan Niazi as Tariq
 Birjees Farooqui as Salma
 Saleem Mairaj
 Aisha Khan (Senior)

Broadcast and availability 
 It was aired on Hum Europe in UK, on Hum World in Canda, USA and Australia and Hum TV Mena in the UAE with same time slot and premiere date. All International broadcasting aired the series in accordance with their standard times.
 The show was aired on MBC 2premiering 29 January 2019 and aired every Monday - Friday 16:30.
 Tum Mere Pass Raho is available on Eros Now app to stream online

References

External links
 Official Hum TV Website
 Official Playlist on YouTube
 Official Playlist on Dailymotion
 Official Facebook Page

Hum TV original programming
Urdu-language television shows
Pakistani drama television series
2015 Pakistani television series debuts
2015 Pakistani television series endings